Seawolf Park is a memorial to , a United States Navy  mistakenly sunk by U.S. Navy forces in 1944 during World War II. It is located on Pelican Island, just north of Galveston, Texas, in the United States. The park has two museum ships, submarine and a destroyer escort, along with parts from three other vessels and offshore the remains of a former merchant ship. Other activities at the park include a picnic area and fishing.

History
Following World War II, the United States Congress decreed that each state shall create a memorial park to one of the United States Navy submarines lost during the war. Texas chose a site on Pelican Island in Galveston, a former location for immigration in the state. In 1971, the   submarine  was transferred from the United States Navy and towed to the site of the park. The park was named after the submarine  which was lost in the Pacific Ocean during World War II.

Attractions
Seawolf Park is unique in that it has a submarine, the remains of a merchant ship, and a destroyer escort designed to conduct anti-submarine warfare—the hunter, hunted, and the protector—all in one museum area. Also preserved at the park is the conning tower of the  submarine  and the sail of the  nuclear attack submarine . Cavalla is listed on the National Register of Historic Places and Stewart in listed as a National Historic Landmark.

Two bronze,  ship propellers formerly attached to USS Stewart can be seen alongside the ladder going up to Stewarts deck. The propellers were removed from the ship so they can be seen by visitors. Behind the propellers are two , 50-caliber memorial guns donated from the battleship .

The park has a picnic area, and fishing is allowed on the pier for a small fee. There is also pedestrian access to the shoreline on either side of the park where anglers can fish for free. Fish that can be caught in the park area include sand seatrout, speckled trout, gafftopsail catfish, drum, and flounder, among others.

See also
 List of United States submarines designated as memorials
 List of maritime museums in the United States
 List of museum ships

References

External links

 Cavalla Historical Foundation
 Galveston Naval Museum at Seawolf Park 

Maritime museums in Texas
Culture of Galveston, Texas
Museums in Galveston, Texas
Naval museums in the United States
Parks in Texas
Protected areas of Galveston County, Texas